Hoengseong County is a county located in southwestern Gangwon Province, South Korea, bordering Pyeongchang-gun to the east, Yangpyeong-gun, Gyeonggi-do to the west, Hongcheon-gun to the north, and Wonju-si and Yeongwol-gun to the south.

The roots of Codonopsis lanceolata, a bonnet bellflower species, play an important role in local agriculture, as does Hanwoo beef, a specialty product.

The Korean Minjok Leadership Academy, a notable boarding school, is located in the county, as is Minjok Military High School, an autonomous private high school that recruits students nationwide.

It may be confused with Hongseong-gun, Chungcheongnam-do because its name is similar.

Symbols
 Tree : Zelkova
 Flower : Peony
 Bird : Heron

History
During the Goguryeo period (A.D. 413–475), it was called Hoengcheon-hyeon (橫川縣) or Eosamae (於斯買).[8] During the reign of King Gyeongdeok of Silla (AD 551), it was changed to Hwangcheonhyeon (潢川縣) and became the Yeonghyeon of Sakju (now Chuncheon).
In the Goryeo Dynasty, it was changed to Hoengcheon again and subordinated to Sakju as before. Afterwards, it was made as a sub-hyeon of Wonju.
In 1413 (13th year of King Taejong), Hyeongam was placed during the Joseon Dynasty, and Hoengcheon and Hongcheon were renamed Hoengseong in 1414 to avoid confusion due to the similar pronunciation.

Climate
Hoengseong has a monsoon-influenced humid continental climate (Köppen: Dwa) with cold, dry winters and hot, rainy summers. The climate reflects the location of the mountainous inland area of southwest. There is a wide seasonal difference in temperature.

Population
Hongseong's decline of population is the biggest matter among the county's residents and officers. The staggering decline has forced the educational system to close small schools (less than ten students per school) to close. Hoengseong county has established incentives for enrolling in the schools.

Korean beef
Han-u, or Korean beef, from Hoengseong is widely sold and famous in South Korea. The clean environment of the region makes it possible to rear high-quality Korean beef. The muscles of the cattle are built up through labour in the fields. Beef sets are delivered to department stores in Seoul and other metropolitan cities. Nowadays, improvements to transportation infrastructure have helped reduce the cost. The county began a strategic marketing campaign in 1995 to brand itself as the origin of the highest quality beef in Korea.

Recreational Areas
The Hoengseong area features large forested areas thanks to its location. More than four forest resorts are still in operation.

Forests are not completely natural, man-made forests are blended into existing natural forests. All kinds of wildlife, including roe deer, wild pigs, and rabbits, inhabit the forests.

Wind farms
Schemes for building wind farms started in 2005 and allowed investors to complete the construction of a first complex in January 2008.

Hoengseong did install wind power plants after 2009. Construction was planned and executed by Japanese developer Eurus Energy and POSCO, installing about 20 plants around windy area.
Total plant locations were divided between the counties of Hoengseong (9) and Pyeongchang (11), respectively.

Sister cities
 Linhai, Zhejiang, China
 Kakegawa, Shizuoka Prefecture, Japan
 Seocho-gu, Seoul

Famous people
Famous people born in Hoengseong County include Kim Heechul of Super Junior, and Lee Hyung-Taik.

See also
 Geography of South Korea

References

External links
 Hoengseong County government home page 

 
Counties of Gangwon Province, South Korea
힐스테이트 원주 레스티지